The People's Front of Liberation Tigers is a political party in Sri Lanka, founded as the political wing of the LTTE in 1989. Mahattaya was the founding president of the PFLT. PFLT took part as an observer in the August 12, 1989 All Party Conference, and was prepared to take part in elections. PFLT did, however, withdraw from the political process as the war erupted again.

PFLT held its first conference February 24-March 1, 1990, in Vaharai, Batticaloa District. The conference adopted a party manifesto and constitution. An estimated 15 000 persons took part in the conference.

Dilip Yogaratnam, 'Yogi, is the general secretary of the party. The election symbol of the party is a tiger. The party contested the 2008 Eastern Provincial Council election. The LTTE did, however, denounce its participation as a government ploy.

In August 2011 it was reported that the party is to be deregistered.

References

1989 establishments in Sri Lanka
Defunct political parties in Sri Lanka
Political parties established in 1989
Political parties in Sri Lanka
Sri Lankan Tamil nationalist parties